The 2018 Kunming Open was a professional tennis tournament played on outdoor clay courts. It was the seventh (ATP) and first (WTA) edition of the tournament and part of the 2018 ATP Challenger Tour and the 2018 WTA 125K series. It took place in Anning, China, from 23 April–5 May 2018.

Men's singles main draw entrants

Seeds 

 1 Rankings as of 16 April 2018.

Other entrants 
The following players received wildcards into the singles main draw:
  Bai Yan
  Li Yuanfeng
  Wang Ruikai
  Wang Ruixuan

The following players received entry from the qualifying draw:
  Sriram Balaji
  Chung Yun-seong
  Sasikumar Mukund
  Vishnu Vardhan

The following player entered as a lucky loser:
  Hugo Grenier

Women's singles main draw entrants

Seeds 

 1 Rankings as of 23 April 2018.

Other entrants 
The following players received wildcards into the singles main draw:
  Jiang Xinyu
  Peng Shuai
  Tang Qianhui
  Yang Zhaoxuan
  Zheng Wushuang

The following players received entry from the qualifying draw:
  Nagi Hanatani
  Natalija Kostić
  Nika Kukharchuk
  Aleksandrina Naydenova

Women's doubles main draw entrants

Seeds 

 Rankings are as of 23 April 2018

The following team received wildcard into the doubles draw:
  Ren Jiaqi /  Zheng Wushuang

Champions

Men's singles

 Prajnesh Gunneswaran def.  Mohamed Safwat, 5–7, 6–3, 6–1

Women's singles

 Irina Khromacheva def.  Zheng Saisai, 3–6, 6–4, 7–6(7–5)

Men's doubles

 Aliaksandr Bury /  Lloyd Harris def.  Gong Maoxin /  Zhang Ze, 6–3, 6–4

Women's doubles

 Dalila Jakupović /  Irina Khromacheva def.  Guo Hanyu /  Sun Xuliu, 6–1, 6–1

References

2018 in Chinese tennis
2018
2018 WTA 125K series
Kunming Open